The Weltmer Bowl is a multi purpose athletic field on the grounds of Spring Grove Hospital Center, a state-operated psychiatric hospital that is located in Catonsville, near Baltimore, Maryland. The field was built in 1936 and is named after Silas W. Weltmer, M.D., who was the hospital's superintendent during the 1930s and 1940s. 

Weltmer Bowl

The Bowl is most known for baseball. During its heyday in the 1930s to the 1960s, the bowl was standing room only for the hospital's baseball team. This field saw many future Major League stars, and future Hall of Famers. In the early 1960s, Hall of Famer Reggie Jackson played here, and his team defeated Spring Grove for the championship. The Welmer Bowl is regularly used today for amateur and semi professional baseball, softball, soccer and lacrosse.

References

Defunct baseball venues in the United States
Defunct sports venues in Maryland
Baseball venues in Maryland
Softball venues in Maryland
Soccer venues in Maryland
Lacrosse venues in Maryland
1936 establishments in Maryland
Sports venues completed in 1936